Piet van Heusden (11 July 1929 – 15 January 2023) was a Dutch cyclist. He competed in'the individual pursuit and was the amateur world champion in 1952.

Awards
1952
 1st  Individual pursuit, UCI Amateur Track World Championships

References

1929 births
2023 deaths
Dutch male cyclists
UCI Track Cycling World Champions (men)
Cyclists from Amsterdam